is a volcanic island to the south of Japan in northernmost Micronesia. It is the southernmost and most isolated inhabited island of the Izus, which are politically and administratively part of Japan but geographically not part of the Japanese archipelago. The islands border the northeast Philippine Sea and lie immediately north of the Bonin Islands, which are also governed by Japan.

The village of Aogashima administers the island under Hachijō Subprefecture of Tokyo Metropolis. Aogashima is also within the boundaries of the Fuji-Hakone-Izu National Park.

Geology
Aogashima is a complex Quaternary volcanic island 3.5 km in length with a maximum width of 2.5 km, formed by the overlapping remnants of at least four submarine calderas. The island is surrounded by very steep rugged cliffs of layered volcanic deposits. The southern coast also rises to a sharp ridge forming one edge of a caldera named  with a diameter of 1.5 km. The caldera is occupied by a secondary cone named . Still considered a Class-C active volcano by the Japan Meteorological Agency, the last eruption of Aogashima was during a four-year period from 1781–1785. It is located along the Izu–Bonin–Mariana Arc.

Important Bird Area
The island has been recognised as an Important Bird Area (IBA) by BirdLife International because it supports populations of Japanese woodpigeons, Pleske's grasshopper warblers, Ijima's leaf-warblers and Izu thrushes.

History
The history of human settlement on Aogashima is uncertain. Most of the people on Aogashima are Japanese. The island is mentioned in Edo period records kept at Hachijō-jima, which recorded volcanic activity in 1652, and from 1670 to 1680. An earthquake swarm in July 1780 was followed by steam rising from the lakes in the Ikenosawa Caldera. Further earthquakes in May 1781 led to an eruption. In April 1783, lava flows from the Maruyama cone resulted in the evacuation of all 63 households on the island. During a massive eruption in 1785, some 130–140 of the population of 327 islanders perished.

See also
 List of islands of Japan
 List of volcanoes in Japan

References

External links

 Aogashima Village Official Website
 Aogashima - Japan Meteorological Agency 
  - Japan Meteorological Agency
 Aogashima - Geological Survey of Japan
 

Izu Islands
Active volcanoes
Islands of Tokyo
VEI-5 volcanoes
Calderas of Japan
Important Bird Areas of the Nanpo Islands